The Federation of Food Processing (FAYT) was a trade union representing workers in the food processing sector in Spain.

The union was founded in 1977, as an affiliate of the Workers' Commissions.  By 1981, it had 21,511 members, and as of 1994 its membership had grown to 31,625.  In 2000, it merged with the Federation of Agriculture, to form the Federation of Agrifood.

References

Food processing trade unions
Trade unions established in 1977
Trade unions disestablished in 2016
Trade unions in Spain